The Caproni Campini N.1, also known as the C.C.2, is an experimental jet aircraft built in the 1930s by Italian aircraft manufacturer Caproni. The N.1 first flew in 1940 and was briefly regarded as the first successful jet-powered aircraft in history, before news emerged of the German Heinkel He 178's first flight a year earlier.

During 1931, Italian aeronautics engineer Secondo Campini submitted his studies on jet propulsion, including a proposal for a so-called thermo-jet to power an aircraft. Following a high-profile demonstration of a jet-powered boat in Venice, Campini was rewarded with an initial contract issued by the Italian government to develop and manufacture his proposed engine. During 1934, the Regia Aeronautica (the Italian Air Force) granted its approval to proceed with the production of a pair of jet-powered prototype aircraft. To produce this aircraft, which was officially designated as the N.1, Campini formed an arrangement with the larger Caproni aviation manufacturer.

The N.1 is powered by a motorjet, a type of jet engine in which the compressor is driven by a conventional reciprocating engine. On 27 August 1940, the first flight of the N.1 took place at the Caproni facility in Taliedo, outside of Milan, flown by  Mario de Bernardi. On 30 November 1941 the second prototype was flown by De Bernardi and engineer Giovanni Pedace from Milan's Linate Airport to Rome's Guidonia Airport, in a highly publicised event that included a fly-past over Rome and a reception with Italian Prime Minister Benito Mussolini.  Testing of the N.1 continued into 1943, when work on the project was disrupted by the Allied invasion of Italy.

The N.1 achieved mixed results; while it was perceived and commended as a crucial milestone in aviation (until the revelation of the He 178's earlier flight), the performance of the aircraft was unimpressive. Specifically, it was slower than some existing conventional aircraft of the era, while the motorjet engine was incapable of producing sufficient thrust to deliver adequate performance for a fighter aircraft. Campini embarked on further projects, such as the Reggiane Re.2007, but involved the indigenously-developed motorjet being replaced with a German-provided turbojet. As such, the N.1 programme never led to any operational combat aircraft, and the motorjet design was soon superseded by more powerful turbojets. Only one of the two examples of the N.1 to have been constructed has survived to the present day.

Background
During 1931, Italian aeronautics engineer Secondo Campini submitted a report to the Regia Aeronautica (the Italian Air Force) on the potential of jet propulsion; this report included his proposals for one such implementation, which he referred to as a thermo-jet. That same year, Campini established a company, with his two brothers, called the "Velivoli e Natanti a Reazione" (Italian for "Jet Aircraft and Boats") to pursue the development of this engine. In April 1932, the company demonstrated a pump-jet propelled boat in Venice, Italy. The Italian Navy, who had funded the development of the boat, placed no orders but did veto the sale of the design outside of Italy.

During 1934, the Regia Aeronautica granted approval for the development of a pair of prototypes, along with a static testbed, for the purpose of demonstrating the principle of a jet aircraft, as well as to explore potential military applications. As his company lacked the necessary industrial infrastructure for such endeavours, Campini formed an arrangement with the larger Caproni aviation manufacturer, under which the latter provided the required material assistance for the manufacturing of the prototypes. Under this relationship, Campini developed his design, which later received the official Italian Air Force designation of N.1.

Historian Nathanial Edwards has contrasted the relative openness of Italian early jet development work against the high levels of secrecy present within other nation's programmes, such as Britain and Germany. He speculated that this was due to desire of the Italian government to be perceived as possessing a modern and advanced aviation industry, being keen to acquire national prestige and renown for such achievements. Edwards went onto claim that the practicality of the N.1 design was undermined by political pressure to speed the programme along so that Italy would be more likely to be the first country in the world to perform a jet-powered flight.

Design

The Caproni Campini N.1 is an experimental aircraft, designed to demonstrate the practicality of jet propulsion and its viability as an engine for aircraft. It was a monoplane built entirely out of duralumin, with an elliptical wing. The initial aircraft lacked elements such as a pressurised cabin; however, these improvements were featured on the second prototype. However, flight testing quickly revealed that, due to the excessive heat output of the propulsion system, the canopy had to be left permanently open as a mitigating measure.

The engine of the N.1 differs substantially from the later-produced turbojet and turbofan engines. The airflow provided by the compressor was used to cool the engine before being mixed with the engine's exhaust gases, thus recovering most of the heat energy that in traditional piston-propeller designs would be wasted. A ring-shaped burner then injected fuel into the gas flow and ignited it, immediately before the exhaust nozzle, to further increase thrust.

In practice the engine provided enough thrust for flight without activating the rear burner, making the design somewhat similar to a ducted fan coupled to an afterburner. Campini referred to this configuration as being a thermojet, although it has since become commonly known as motorjet. However, despite the elaborate design, the relatively small size of the duct limited the mass flow and thus the propulsive efficiency of the engine. In modern designs this is offset through high overall pressure ratios, which could not be achieved on the N.1, therefore resulting in relatively low thrust and poor fuel efficiency.

Operational history

The N.1s first flight was made on 27 August 1940 by test pilot Mario De Bernardi at Caproni's facility in Taliedo, outside Milan. He would conduct the majority of the N.1's test flights. The first flight lasted ten minutes, during which de Bernardi kept the speed below , less than half throttle. 

Although the first flight of the jet-powered Heinkel He 178 had been made a year before to the day, it had not been made public, so the Fédération Aéronautique Internationale recorded the N.1 as the first successful flight by a jet aircraft.

Flight tests with the first prototype revealed several issues with the engine. It did not produce sufficient thrust to achieve the anticipated performance if it was matched to a strengthened airframe to withstand the high loading pressures. The engine generated considerable heat, which forced the pilot to fly with the canopy open throughout the flight, which although effectively venting the heat, increased drag. According to aviation author Sterling Michael Pavelec the N.1 was "heavy and underpowered" and the conventionally-powered Caproni Vizzola F.4 was faster which he attributed to limited national resources which left development programs underfunded. 

On 30 November 1941 the second prototype was flown by de Bernardi, with Giovanni Pedace as a passenger, from Milan's Linate Airport to Rome's Guidonia Airport, in a highly publicised event which included a fly-past over Rome and a reception hosted by Italian Prime Minister Benito Mussolini. It was the first cross-country jet flight. The flight included a stopover at Pisa, possibly to refuel, and was made without using the rear burner.

A Russian aircraft design bureau, TsAGI, obtained some details of the motorjet, and developed their own. Campini later formed a partnership with another Italian aircraft company, Reggiane, and with Roberto Longhi, modified the Reggiane Re.2005 to create the Re.2005R with a motor jet. Speed could have been increased to 750 km/h (470 mph) but fuel consumption would have reached nearly 1,000 L/h (61 imp gal/ks), almost four times the normal consumption of the Re.2005, at full throttle.

Testing of the two N.1 prototypes continued into 1943; however one of the N.1s was partially destroyed when the Caproni factory was bombed, and the collapse of the Fascist government following the Allied invasion of Italy hindered the programme. After the defeat of Italy, the damaged prototype was transported to the United Kingdom for study at the Royal Aircraft Establishment (RAE) in Farnborough. The fate of this aircraft remains unknown.

Surviving aircraft

The surviving example is now on display at the Italian Air Force Museum at Vigna di Valle, near Rome, while the ground testbed, consisting of only the fuselage, is on display at the National Museum of Science and Technology in Milan.

Specifications

See also

References

Citations

Bibliography

 Golly, John. Jet: Frank Whittle and the Invention of the Jet Engine. Datum Publishing, 1996. .
 Mark, Harrison. The Economics Of Coercion And Conflict. World Scientific, 2014. .
 Morse, Stan. Illustrated Encyclopedia of Aircraft. Orbis Publishing, 1982.
 Pavelec, Sterling Michael. The jet race and the Second World War. Praeger Security International: Westport, Connecticut. 2007. .

External links

 Photographs and a cutaway drawing of the N.1
 
 Jet Propulsion pg 50, Life, November 27, 1944

Campini N.1
1940s Italian experimental aircraft
Motorjet-powered aircraft
Low-wing aircraft
World War II Italian experimental aircraft
World War II jet aircraft of Italy
Aircraft first flown in 1940